This is a list of television programmes  formerly broadcast by Sahara One.

Comedy series

Bhagwaan Bachaaye Inko (2004)
Don't Worry Ho Jayega (2000)
Hi! Padosi... Kaun Hai Doshi? (2011)
Hum Dono (2000)
Hukum Mere Aaka (2003–2004)
Ruby Duby Hub Dub (2004)
Shubh Mangal Savadhan (2002–2004)

Drama series

Aakhir Bahu Bhi Toh Beti Hee Hai (2013–2014)
Arzoo Hai Tu (2003–2004)
Bitto (2010–2011)
Buniyaad (2006)
Chacha Chaudhary (2002–2004)
Daaman (2001–2002)
Do Lafzon Ki Kahani (2001)
Doli Saja Ke (2007–2009)
Ek Chutki Aasman (2010)
Firangi Bahu (2013–2014)
Ganga Kii Dheej (2010–2011)
Ghar Aaja Pardesi (2013)
Ghar Ek Sapnaa (2007–2009)
Hamaari Beti Raaj Karegi (2010–2011)
Haqeeqat (2001)
Har Mod Par (2002)
Hare Kkaanch Ki Choodiyaan (2005–2006)
Haunted Nights (2012–2013)
Isse Kehte Hai Golmaal Ghar (2004–2005)
Jai Jai Jai Bajrang Bali (2011–2015)
Jhilmil Sitaaron Ka Aangan Hoga (2012–2013)
Jo Ishq Ki Marzi Woh Rab Ki Marzi (2009)
Kaala Saaya (2011)
Kagaar (2002–2004)
Kagaz Ki Kashti (2002–2003)
Kahani Chandrakanta Ki (2011–2012)
Kahi To Milenge (2002–2003)
Kaisi Laagi Lagan (2008–2009)
Kamini Damini (2004–2005)
Karishma - The Miracles of Destiny (2003–2004)
Kesariya Balam Aavo Hamare Des (2009–2011)
Kise Apna Kahein (2003)
Kituu Sabb Jaantii Hai (2005–2007)
Kohinoor (2005)
Kucchh Pal Saath Tumhara (2003–2004)
Kuch Apne Kuch Paraye (2006–2007)
Kuchh Love Kuchh Masti (2004–2005)
Main Aisi Kyunn Hoon (2007–2008)
Malini Iyer (2004–2005)
Masakali (2014–2015)
Mata Ki Chowki (2008–2011)
Mera Sasural (2008)
Mr. & Mrs. Mishra (2009)Neeli Aankhen (2008)Neem Neem Shahad Shahad (2011–2012)Parchhaiyan (2002)Piya Ka Ghar Pyaara Lage (2011–2012)Prratima (2004–2005)Power Trip (2004–2005)Raat Hone Ko Hai (2004–2005)Rishton Ke Bhanwar Mein Uljhi Niyati (2011–2014)Ruby Duby Hub Dub (2004)Saath Rahega Always (2005–2006)Saathiya – Pyar Ka Naya Ehsaas (2004–2005)Santaan (2001)Sahib Biwi Gulam (2004)Sati...Satya Ki Shakti (2006)Shorr (2010–2011)Shubh Kadam (2009)Solhah Singaarr (2006–2008)Tujh Sang Preet Lagai Sajna (2012–2013)Virasaat (2002)Woh Rehne Waali Mehlon Ki (2005–2011)Zaara (2006–2008)Zameen Se Aassman Tak (2004)

Reality/non-scripted programmingBiggest Loser Jeetega (2007)Comedy Champions (2008)Fateh (2002)Hello (2003)Jjhoom India (2007–2008)Saas v/s Bahu (2008)Style Mantra (2004)Sur Kshetra (2012)

Hindi dubbed series
Animated seriesJust Kids! shows (2002–2004)Bhallu Sahab Ki KahaniDenver, the Last DinosaurThe Jungle BookThe Legend of ZorroThe New Adventures of Kimba The White LionPocahontasSandokanThe Story of CinderellaSpacetoon Hour (2005–2006)Captain TsubasaCrush Gear TurboEnchanted Princess PartyMe & My BrothersFilmsPhir Se (2005)Familywala'' (2014)

References

S
S